The Kubongsan Line is an electrified standard-gauge secondary line of the Korean State Railway in South P'yŏngan Province, North Korea, running from Ch'ŏngch'ŏn'gang on the P'yŏngŭi Line to East Namhŭng.

History
The line was opened by the Korean State Railway in the 1970s.

Services
The line serves the February 20 Factory of the Korean People's Army near Kubongsan, as well as the Anju Silicate Brick Factory (안주씨리카트벽돌공장, Anju Ssirik'at'ŭ Pyŏktol Kongjang) adjacent to East Namhŭng Station. The brick factory was opened in December 1986.

Route
A yellow background in the "Distance" box indicates that section of the line is not electrified.

References

Railway lines in North Korea
Standard gauge railways in North Korea